Tapponia is a monotypic genus of Southeast Asian lynx spiders containing the single species, Tapponia micans. It was first described by Eugène Louis Simon in 1885, and is only found in Indonesia and Malaysia.

See also
 List of Oxyopidae species

References

Monotypic Araneomorphae genera
Oxyopidae
Spiders of Asia